Ismaïl Mansouri (born January 7, 1988 in Sour El-Ghozlane) is an Algerian football player who plays as a goalkeeper for SKAF Khemis Miliana.

Club career
On October 2, 2010, Mansouri made his professional debut for USM Alger in a league match against MC Saïda.

Honours

Club
USM Alger
 Algerian Ligue Professionnelle 1 (3): 2013-14, 2015-16, 2018–19
 Algerian Cup (1): 2013
 Algerian Super Cup (2): 2013, 2016
 UAFA Club Cup (1): 2013

MO Béjaïa
 Algerian Cup: 2015

References

External links
 DZFoot Profile
 

1988 births
Living people
Algerian footballers
Algerian Ligue Professionnelle 1 players
People from Bouïra Province
USM Alger players
Association football goalkeepers
21st-century Algerian people